Ogor Leonard Okuweh (born 1959) is a Nigerian politician. He is a member of Nigerian House of Representatives representing Isoko North/Isoko South federal constituency of Delta State under the People's Democratic Party in Nigeria.

Education 
Ogor Okuweh obtained his WAEC from Notre Dame College Ozoro. He then went to Emile Woo-ff College of Accountancy where he obtained an A.I.B before attending Chartered Institute of Administration and finally became a Chartered Administrator. He also holds an International Executive Master of Business Administration, IEMBA in Strategic and Project Management from the Paris Graduate School of Management, PGSM in Paris, France.

Career 
In 2003, Ogor was elected in the Nigerian House of Representatives representing Isoko North/Isoko South federal constituency of Delta State.

References 

1959 births
Living people
People from Delta State
Delta State politicians